Jeffrey E. Cardoni (born January 10, 1972) is an American composer. He is a multi-instrumentalist who studied classical piano before playing drums and guitar in numerous bands, including a brief stint with the rock band Alien Crime Syndicate.

Biography 
After graduating James M. Coughlin High School, Cardoni studied engineering at Pennsylvania State University. Cardoni is best known for his work on television projects such as CSI: Miami, Silicon Valley (TV series), Ghosts (American TV series), Heels (TV series), The League, Wilfred, and film scores, such as Me Time (film), Step Up: All In, The Vicious Kind, Just Friends, Firehouse Dog, and many others. Cardoni also did the score for Open Season 3.

Cardoni studied classical piano beginning age 7. While touring with Alien Crime Syndicate, the group's manager suggested he enroll in UCLA film scoring classes. It was these courses that piqued Cardoni's interest in the film music industry.

Cardoni has stated that his classical training has greatly informed his compositional style—whereas many composers prioritize computer technology in their scores and workflows, he prefers to work with musical instruments whenever possible, and continues to hand notate themes in his scores whenever taking on a new project. He also identifies himself as partial to "old-fashioned" scores that put melody above ambient sonic textures. Despite this proclivity, he recognizes that the current nature of the film music industry necessitates familiarity and fluency with various pieces of software and technology, which he includes in his current studio setup. Cardoni has explained that the meeting point between the worlds of technology and melodic counterpoint has informed some of his scores, including The Secret Lives of Dorks (2013).

Depending on the project, Cardoni is known to use a variety of unique instruments, including bowed xylophones, bowed saws and autoharps.

Awards and nominations
Cardoni was nominated in 2006 for a Silver Ariel Award for Best Original Score.

Selected filmography

References

External links
 Official website
 

Living people
American male composers
21st-century American composers
Place of birth missing (living people)
1973 births
21st-century American male musicians
Musicians from Pennsylvania
People from Wilkes-Barre, Pennsylvania